The Brown Carpathian  is a breed of cattle from Western Ukraine. Found in the Trans-Carpathian region of Ukraine, the breed was the result of crossing Brown Swiss with the local cattle to produce a dual-purpose breed for dairy and beef production. The breed was first recognized in 1972, and since the 1980s there have been further crossings with Brown Swiss and Jersey bulls.

References

Cattle breeds originating in Ukraine
Animal breeds originating in the Soviet Union
Cattle breeds